The Lakshmi Narain College of Technology (abbreviated LNCTB or LNCT Bhopal) is a technology-oriented institute of higher education established by LNCT Group of Colleges.

History
Lakshmi Narain College of Technology, Bhopal (Popularly known as LNCT) is a private engineering college established in 1993 to attract bright young students from across the country. It was founded by the Kalchuri Educational Trust, Bhopal. The objective of the institute is to produce skilled manpower of the highest quality who is able to cope with the challenges of ever evolving industrial needs of the country.

The college is affiliated to the Rajiv Gandhi Technical University, Bhopal, the technical university of Madhya Pradesh for engineering courses, Barkatullah University (BU), Bhopal for management and pharmacy courses and approved by the All India Council for Technical Education (AICTE) New Delhi and Pharmacy Council of India (PCI).

In 2006 the Lakshmi Narain College of Technology & Science (LNCTS) and in 2015 the Lakshmi Narain College of Technology Excellence (LNCTE) was established as the constituent colleges of LNCT on the same campus.

In 2013 the LNCT was awarded the Best Institute of Bhopal by CMAI (Communication, Multimedia and Infrastructure of India) in National Madhya Pradesh Education Awards. Also , the college got NBA Accredited in 2017 .

Campus and location

The institute is in Kalchuri Nagar, Raisen road, Bhopal, about 9 km from Habibganj Railway Station (Bhopal). It is close to BHEL Bhopal. The Raja Bhoj Airport in Gandhi Nagar is close.

The institute is on a campus of 00 acres. There are five buildings that house the academics and research centers. In addition to this, the academic building has tutorial rooms, lecture halls, computers and electronics labs and offices of the administrations and faculty. The campus is fully equipped with facilities like central library (digital library, Internet lab), digital classrooms, hostel, mess, central workshop, auditorium, and a sports ground . 
.

Degrees
M.Tech.
B.Tech.
Diploma
Pharmacy
MBA
MCA

Engineering Departments
Chemistry
Chemical Engineering
Civil Engineering
Computer Science Engineering
Electrical Engineering
Electrical & Electronics Engineering
Electronics & Communication Engineering
Humanities & Social Science
Information Technology 
Mathematics
Mechanical Engineering
Management Studies
Physics

A documentary on mechanical engineering department of LNCT was telecast on Indian national television news channel DD News.

Rankings
Ranked AIR 184 by NIRF, Ministry of Education, Government of India in 2021.

In rankings among engineering colleges in India it was ranked 74 in 2018 by Outlook India survey.

Academics and admission
LNCT offers undergraduate, postgraduate and research degrees across disciplines in engineering, management, computer applications, and pharmacy. For the undergraduate curriculum, admission to the B.E. is done through the Joint Entrance Examination (Main) counselling followed by Directorate of Technical Education Madhya Pradesh Government. For the postgraduate curriculum, admission to the MTech programmes are through the Graduate Aptitude Test in Engineering (GATE). Admission in other courses are through a state-level entrance test.

Training and placement
LNCT has signed MOU with Tata Consultancy Services (TCS), Ericsson India Pvt. Ltd. and Oracle under a Workforce Development Program. LNCT has been accredited from TCS, Wipro and Capgemini. It has been first institute in Madhya Pradesh chosen for a Microsoft Innovation Center and also Oracle innovation centre .

Major recruiters include Microsoft, Oracle, Amazon, Syntel, Samsung, Cognizant, TCS, Tech Mahindra, Wipro, Infosys, cognizant, Capgemini, Larsen & Toubro Infotech, Dell, IBM, Computer Sciences Corporation, Zensar, Reliance Communications, Mu Sigma Inc., Cummins, Amdocs, Godrej, HCL, Ericsson, UST Global, Zycus, Yodlee, Sears Holdings, Persistent Systems, Aricent, Aon Hewitt, Mphasis, Atos, Ashok Leyland, Google, HP, Renault, Indian Army, Indian Navy,  etc.

Clubs and activities

LNCT Bhopal has been hosted the Indian Language Conference in which Hon'ble Chief Minister of Madhya Pradesh Shri Shivraj Singh Chouhan was chief guest.
LNCT Bhopal has tie-ups with Elite Football League of India for EFLI University League.
NCC LNCT
NSS LNCT
LNCT Coders Group (LCG) -- Official Coding Club of LNCT 
Quest Nature Club
LNCT Photography Club
Technical Festival -SRISHTI
Techno SRIJAN organized by MPCST 
Planet Engineer's
Engineers Olympic

See also
Lakshmi Narain College of Technology, Jabalpur
Maulana Azad National Institute of Technology (MACT)
Joint Entrance Examination
List of educational institutions in Bhopal
Bhopal

References

External links
LNCT's Official website
LNCT's University Official website
RGPV

Engineering colleges in Madhya Pradesh
Universities and colleges in Madhya Pradesh
Universities and colleges in Bhopal